Square Peg in a Round Hole, (often misquoted as Apparatjik World) is the second studio album from rock supergroup Apparatjik.  It was originally released via Apparatjik's iPad application, Apparatjik World, on 11 November 2011, as the "first edition" of the album. The production of the album included the help and support of Apparatjik fans to produce a further 10 more editions of the album before the final version was released on 21 February 2012.

Track listing
All songs written and composed by Guy Berryman, Jonas Bjerre, Magne Furuholmen and Martin Terefe.

Release history

References

External links
Official Apparatjik Website
Apparatjik World, iPad app
Eye On Committee Website
Apparatjik on Myspace
Official Apparatjik YouTube Page
Apparatchick: Unofficial Apparatjik Fan Site

2011 albums
Apparatjik albums
A-ha